Heinrich Schrader (born 1878, date of death unknown) was a German fencer. He competed in the individual épée event at the 1912 Summer Olympics.

References

1878 births
Year of death missing
German male fencers
Olympic fencers of Germany
Fencers at the 1912 Summer Olympics